Mediacorp Channel 8's television series Hero is a family-drama series produced by Mediacorp Studios in 2016, starring Shaun Chen, Jesseca Liu and Chen Hanwei.

The show aired on Mediacorp Channel 8 from 29 November 2016 with 30 episodes.

Episodes

Webisodes
The webisodes are available on Toggle.

See also
List of MediaCorp Channel 8 Chinese Drama Series (2010s)
Hero

Lists of Singaporean television series episodes